Chhatrapati Square is a metro station on the Orange Line of the Nagpur Metro serving the Chhatrapati Nagar, Narendra Nagar, and Sneh Nagar areas of Nagpur. It was opened on 6 April 2021.

The station covers an area of 12,568 square meters. It is located adjacent to a bus station.

Station Layout

References

Nagpur Metro stations
Railway stations in India opened in 2021